This is a timeline documenting events of jazz in the year 1935

Events
 The beginning of the “Swing Era”.
 Ella Fitzgerald won a one-week performance at the Harlem Opera House.

Standards

Deaths
 January
 31 – Edwin Swayze, American jazz trumpeter and composer (born 1906).

 May
 3 – Cecil Irwin, American jazz reed player and arranger (born 1902).

 July
 21 – Honoré Dutrey, dixieland jazz trombonist (born 1894).

 April
 2 – Bennie Moten, American jazz pianist and band leader (born 1894).

 November
  27 – Charlie Green, jazz trombonists, and the soloist in the Fletcher Henderson orchestra (born 1893).

Births

 January
 5 – Chuck Flores, American drummer (died 2016).
 6 – Nino Tempo, American musician, singer, and actor.
 7
 Kenny Davern, American clarinetist (died 2006).
 Sam Woodyard, American drummer (died 1988).
 18 – Rodgers Grant, American pianist (died 2012).
 30 – Tubby Hayes, English saxophonist and multi-instrumentalist (died 1973).

 February
 10 – Johnny Helms, American trumpeter (died 2015).
 14 – Rob McConnell, Canadian trombonist (died 2010).
 20 – Orlando Marin, American band leader and timbales player.

 March
 8 – George Coleman, American saxophonist.
 12 – Hugh Lawson, American pianist (died 1997).
 14 – Getatchew Mekurya, Ethiopian saxophonist (died 2016).
 16 – Emil Mijares, Filipino vibist and pianist (died 2007).
 30 – Karl Berger, German pianist and composer.
 31 – Herb Alpert, American trumpeter and record executive.

 April
 1 – Alan Haven, English organist (died 2016).
 9 – Reuben Wilson, American organist.
 10 – Jerzy Milian, Polish vibraphonist (died 2018).
 15 – Gene Cherico, American upright bassist (died 1994).
 19 – Dudley Moore, English pianist and actor (died 2002).
 20
 Herbie Phillips, American trumpeter (died 1995).
 Ran Blake, American pianist, composer, and educator.
 22 – Paul Chambers, American upright bassist (died 1969).
 23
 Bunky Green, American alto saxophonist and educator.
 Milton Banana, Brazilian drummer (died 1998).
 24 – Allan Jaffe, American jazz tubist (died 1987).

 May
 1
 Henry Grimes, American upright bassist, violinist, and poet.
 Heraldo do Monte, Brazilian guitarist.
 4 – Don Friedman, American pianist (died 2016).
 5 – Kidd Jordan, American saxophonist.
 10
 George Golla, Australian guitarist.
 Julius Wechter, American vibraphonist and percussionist (died 1999).
 12 – Gary Peacock, American upright bassist.
 19
 Cecil McBee, American upright bassist.
 Tore Jensen, Norwegian trumpeter.
 20 – Dino Saluzzi, Argentinian bandoneon player.
 21 – Terry Lightfoot, British clarinetist and bandleader (died 2013).
 22
 Barry Rogers, American trombonist (died 1991).
 Giuseppi Logan, American saxophonist.
 24 – Valerie Capers, American pianist and composer.
 27 – Ramsey Lewis, American composer, pianist, and radio personality.
 31 – Albert Heath, American drummer.

 June
 3
 Enzo Jannacci, Italian singer-songwriter, pianist, actor, and stand-up comedian (died 2013).
 Ted Curson, American trumpeter (died 2012).
 5 – Misha Mengelberg, Dutch pianist and composer (died 2017).
 6 – Grant Green, American guitarist and composer (died 1979).
 15 – François Jeanneau, French saxophonist, flautist, and composer.

 July
 1
 James Cotton, American blues harmonica player, singer and songwriter (died 2017).
 Rashied Ali, American drummer (died 2009).
 3 – Enrico Intra, Italian pianist, composer, conductor.
 9 – Frank Wright, American saxophonist and singer (died 1990).
 12 – John Patton, American pianist (died 2002).
 13 – Pete Escovedo, Mexican-American percussionist.
 29 – Julian Priester, American trombonist.

 August
 3 – Vic Vogel, Canadian pianist and trombonist.
 7 – Rahsaan Roland Kirk, American saxophonist and multi-instrumentalist (died 1977).
 28 – Stan McDonald, American clarinetist and saxophonist.

 September
 1 – Harry Beckett, British trumpeter (died 2010).
 3 – Dorothy Masuka, South African singer.
 8 – James Clay, American saxophonist and flautist (died 1994).
 9 – Fred Stone, Canadian flugelhornist, trumpeter, and pianist (died 1986).
 16 – Gordon Beck, English pianist (died 2011).
 23 – Les McCann, American pianist and singer.
 25
 Bjarne Liller, Danish banjoist and singer (died 1993).
 Roland Alexander, American saxophonist and pianist (died 2006).
 28 – Bent Jædig, Danish saxophonist (died 2004).
 30 – Johnny Mathis, American singer.

 October
 3 – Judy Bailey, New Zealand-born pianist and composer.
 12 – Paul Humphrey, American drummer.
 21
 Bobby Few, American pianist and singer.
 Don Rader, American trumpeter.
 23 – Frank Hewitt, American pianist (died 2002).
 27 – Charlie Tagawa, Japanese-American banjoist (died 2017).

 November
 3 – Harry Leahey, American guitarist (died 1990).
 9 – Jimmy D'Aquisto, Italian-American luthier|guitar maker (died 1995).
 17 – Roswell Rudd, American trombonist and composer (died 2017).
 23 – Alvin Fielder, American drummer (died 2019).
 27 – Michel Portal, French composer, saxophonist, and clarinetist.

 December
 1 – Woody Allen, American filmmaker and clarinetist.
 2 – Ronnie Mathews, American pianist (died 2008).
 5 – Totti Bergh, Norwegian saxophonist (died 2012).
 12 – Juhani Aaltonen, Finnish saxophonist and flautist.
 15 – Dannie Richmond, American drummer (died 1988).
 17 – Ronnie Boykins, American bassist (died 1980).
 19 – Bobby Timmons, American pianist and composer (died 1974).
 22 – Joe Lee Wilson, American singer (died 2011).
 23 – Esther Phillips, American singer (died 1984).
 25 – Ben Dixon, American drummer.
 26 – Noel Kelehan, Irish musician and conductor, RTÉ Concert Orchestra (died 2012).
 31 – Peter Herbolzheimer, German trombonist and bandleader (died 2010).

 Unknown date
 Eddie Khan, American upright bassist.
 Trevor Koehler, American saxophonist (died 1975).
 Tülay German, Turkish singer.
 Yasunao Tone, Japanese artist.

References

External links
 History Of Jazz Timeline: 1935 at All About Jazz

Jazz
Jazz by year